The Best of the Band, Vol. II is the second volume of greatest hits by the Band, released in October 1999 on Rhino Records. It collects eleven tracks from the group's final three studio albums (Jericho, High on the Hog and Jubilation). One track, "Young Blood", had been available in the United States only on a tribute album to Doc Pomus, though it appeared on the British and Japanese pressings of 1996's High on the Hog. The last track, "She Knows", is a live track sung by Manuel.

Track listing
"Stand Up"
"Remedy"
"Back to Memphis"
"Blind Willie McTell"
"Atlantic City"
"Forever Young"
"Young Blood"
"Stuff You Gotta Watch"
"White Cadillac (Ode to Ronnie Hawkins)"
"The High Price of Love"
"She Knows" (Live)

References

1999 greatest hits albums
Albums produced by John Simon (record producer)
Rhino Records compilation albums
The Band compilation albums